Route 885 is a  long north to south secondary highway in the south-eastern portion of New Brunswick, Canada.

Route description
Most of the route is in Kings County.

The route's northern terminus is in New Canaan at Route 112 on the Canaan River. It travels southeast through Canaan Road and Havelock where it briefly merges with Route 880 near Havelock Airport. The route then passes through a mostly wooded area as it arrives in Kinnear Settlement and crosses Route 2. Route 885 then follows the North River as it enters Intervale, where it heads south where it is known as King Rd. It passes the eastern terminus of Route 890 and ends in Petitcodiac at Route 106.

History

See also

References

885
885